Dr Peter Wingfield (born 5 September 1962) is a Welsh-born television actor, well known for his television roles as Dan Clifford in Holby City, Dr. Robert Helm in Queen of Swords and Inspector Simon Ross in Cold Squad but he is internationally best known for his role as the 5000-year-old Immortal Methos in the hit syndicated series Highlander: The Series. He also portrayed Dr. James Watson in Sanctuary.

Wingfield studied medicine before becoming a successful actor, and later returned to medicine as an anesthesiologist.

Acting career
Wingfield has appeared in numerous North American television productions for both Canadian and U.S. companies, including the portrayal of Dr Robert Helm in  Queen of Swords filmed in Spain at Texas Hollywood, Almeria, and the surrounding Tabernas Desert. Executive producer, David Abramowitz, met Peter Wingfield at a Highlander convention in November 1999 and offered him the parts of Doctor Helm or Captain Grisham. Wingfield chose the doctor as a part with more mileage and more challenging.

Highlander
Wingfield played the 5000-year-old Immortal Methos in the syndicated series Highlander: The Series. While filming the fifth Highlander movie Highlander: The Source, Wingfield related his love for Methos:

Medical career
Starting in 2011, Wingfield significantly reduced his acting career responsibilities. Returning full circle to his earlier interest in a career in medicine, he entered the College of Medicine at the University of Vermont as part of the Class of 2015. He received his white coat as part of the UVM College of Medicine White Coat Ceremony in 2012. In 2015, it was announced that he would be joining the residency program at the University of California, San Diego. As of September 2020, he is a  Board Certified Anesthesiologist at Cedars Sinai in Los Angeles CA.

Charitable work
Peter is founder and director of Project Edan, a non-profit organization which raises funds for children's charities such as UNICEF and the Boston Children's Hospital. One of Project Edan's focuses is UNICEF's Believe in Zero campaign, which hopes to reduce child mortality.

Filmography

Film

Television

Video games

References

External links

Official site

1962 births
20th-century Welsh male actors
21st-century Welsh male actors
21st-century Welsh medical doctors
Welsh male film actors
Welsh male television actors
Welsh male voice actors
Expatriate actors in Canada
Welsh emigrants to Canada
Canadian male film actors
Canadian male television actors
Canadian male voice actors
Welsh people of English descent
Living people
Alumni of the Medical College of St Bartholomew's Hospital
Alumni of Brasenose College, Oxford
People educated at The Cathedral School, Llandaff